Godwin Oluwole Omofemi (born 1988) is a Nigerian artist and curator. He was the painter to paint the last commissioned painting of Queen Elizabeth II before her demise. He has held several solo and joint exhibitions both in Nigeria and abroad.

Background and education 
Omofemi is from Edo State, southern Nigeria. He was born and spent most of his childhood with his grandfather in Ekotedo community, Ibadan - the third largest city in Nigeria by population. A part of his growing years was in Agenebode, Etsako with his mother after his parents split up when he was younger.He started painting since childhood. He attended The Polytechnic, Ibadan for his higher education, earning a National Diploma and a Higher National Diploma in painting. For his primary and secondary education, he attended Saviour Apostolic Primary School, Ekotedo and Community Grammar School, Mokola, Ibadan from 1994 to 2000 and from 2001 to 2007 respectively.

Career 
In 2020, Omofemi held his exhibition titled “The Way We Are”. The exhibition which was made up of seventeen oil and acrylic paintings was held at the Signature African Art’s Mayfair Gallery in London. In 2021, he also held the “In Our Days” exhibition in the above named theatre due to the success enjoyed by his exhibition held in the same location the previous year. 2021 also had him display his work in the Out of Africa Gallery in Barcelona in an exhibition titled “Emancipation”. In May 2022, Omofemi was commissioned by Tatler magazine to make a painting of the late Queen Elizabeth II. This painting was to be the last painting of her before her demise.

Some of his signature style includes incorporating the Afro hairstyle, the bald hairstyle and tribal markings in his paintings. According to Okay Africa, this is his way of portraying an African “emblem of liberation, identity, and power” and is “a way of conserving African heritage and tradition”. He also iterated in an interview with The Sun that:
 ‘The hair is special to me just as you have rightly said because of its unique features and symbolic representation. The incident which led to my indulgence in painting hair as a subject matter, particularly afro, began in the late 1960s and early 70s when the civil rights exponents drew more attention to the love-yourself gospel which helped to project confidence, beauty and sparkle to the perception of blacks and their diasporic identity’.

Exhibitions

Solo Shows 

2022 – “A Woman’s Worth” - OOA Gallery – Barcelona, Spain
2021 –  “In our days” - Signature African Art – London, UK
2021 - "Self Addressed" - Group show curated by Kehinde Wiley - Jeffrey Deitch Gallery - Los Angeles, USA
2020 – “The Way we were” – Signature African Art – London, UK 
2019 – “Iriri” (Experience) – Allexis Gallery - Lagos, Nigeria

Group Shows 

2022 – "The Queen" – Sotheby’s Group Show – London, UK
2022 – Volta New York Art Fair – OOA Gallery – New York, USA
2022 – “4000 Ans” – Curated by Destinee Ross-Sutton – Wall House Museum – Saint Barthélemy, France
2021 – 1-54 London Art Fair – OOA Gallery – London, UK
2021 – “Self Addressed” – Curated by Kehinde Wiley – Jeffrey Deith Gallery – Los Angeles, USA
2021 – 1-54 New York – OOA Gallery – New York, USA
2021 - "BLACK EXCELLENCE" - Ross-Sutton Gallery - Miami, USA
2021 - Artexpo | New York 2021, TAAG Gallery - New York, USA
2021 – Duo show “Emancipation” with Rewa - OOA Gallery – Barcelona, Spain 
2020 – “Can’t stop our flow”– JM Gallery – London, UK
2020 – “Locality and the Status Quo” - Pacers Art Gallery – Lagos, Nigeria 
2020 – “Say my Name” – Signature African Art – London, UK 
2020 – Piasa Auction – Paris, France
2019 - “Rise Up” - Signature African Art – London, UK 
2019 - “Mayfair” - Signature African Art – London, UK 
2019 – “Fashion and Art Show” – Belgium 
2019 – “Face & Phases” – Terrakulture Art Gallery - Lagos, Nigeria 
2019 – “Impact Artist Fair” – Eko Atlantic City - Lagos, Nigeria 
2019 – Second Ibadan Affordable Art Fair – Ibadan, Nigeria
2019 – Sogal Art Auction – Signature Beyond - Lagos, Nigeria 
2019 – “Bald is Beautiful” – Alexis Gallery - Lagos, Nigeria
2019 – “Starting point” – Lagos, Nigeria 
2018 – Sogal Art Auction – Signature Beyond -Lagos, Nigeria 
2018 – “New Horizon” – Discova Art Centre - Port Harcourt, Nigeria 
2018 – “Fair & Square” – Alexis Gallery - Lagos, Nigeria 
2018 – “Next of Kin” – Thought Pyramid Gallery - Lagos, Nigeria 
2016 – “Face & Phases” – Terrakulture Art Gallery - Lagos, Nigeria 
2015 – “The Return of the Slave” – Accra, Ghana 
2015 – “Art for Heart” – Lagos, Nigeria 
2015 – “Curore di Donna” – World Art Exhibition – Italy 
2015 – “Face & Phases” – Terrakulture Art Exhibition - Lagos, Nigeria 
2014 – “Emergency” – Lagos, Nigeria 
2013 – “Life in my city Festival” – Alliance Française – Ibadan, Nigeria 
2013 – “Unity” – National Museum - Ibadan, Nigeria

Philanthropy 

In 2021, he started the Oluwole Omofemi Foundation. In 2022, made donations foodstuffs and other aid to widows in the Ekotedo community in Ibadan, Oyo State; the community in which he matured. He did this remembrance of his late mother. Another facet of his philanthropy was creating a yuletide program called “Ijewuru Day”. The scheme brings youths together to motivate them and also has an eating competition segment with prizes to be won.

In a meeting with the deputy governor of Oyo State. He spoke of his intention to initiate a project for his alma mater, The Ibadan Polytechnic.

References